The 2007 China Baseball League season saw the Tianjin Lions defeat the Guangdong Leopards in 3 games to 1 to win the Championship Series.

Standings
Reference:

Southeast Division

Southwest Division

Awards

References

China Baseball League